Karim Hasni is the Algerian Minister of Water Resources and Security. He was appointed as minister on 8 July 2021.

References 

Living people
21st-century Algerian politicians
Algerian politicians
Government ministers of Algeria
Water ministers of Algeria
Year of birth missing (living people)